Michael Mark Sokal is an American historian and educator.  He is retired professor at Worcester Polytechnic Institute in the history of science.  He received his PhD in history of science and technology from Case Western Reserve University in 1972.  His research focuses on James McKeen Cattell, a prominent psychologist and scientific impresario in the late 19th and early 20th centuries.  He was the 2004-2005 president of the History of Science Society.

References 

Year of birth missing (living people)
Living people
Historians of science
Worcester Polytechnic Institute faculty
Case Western Reserve University alumni